Aglaodiaptomus is a genus of copepods in the family Diaptomidae. They are often bright red or blue due to carotenoid pigments.

Conservation status
Species distributions are known very imprecisely, and two species are listed as vulnerable species on the IUCN Red List (marked VU below); both are endemic to the United States. A. kingsburyae was described from "a roadside ditch in Oklahoma and a pool and a pond in Texas", while A. marshianus was described from Lake Jackson, Florida.

Species
The genus Aglaodiaptomus contains 15 species.

Aglaodiaptomus atomicus DeBiase & Taylor, 1997
Aglaodiaptomus clavipes (Schacht, 1897)
Aglaodiaptomus clavipoides M. S. Wilson, 1955
Aglaodiaptomus conipedatus (Marsh, 1907)
Aglaodiaptomus dilobatus M. S. Wilson, 1958
Aglaodiaptomus forbesi Light, 1938
Aglaodiaptomus kingsburyae A. Robertson, 1975 
Aglaodiaptomus leptopus (S. A. Forbes, 1882)
Aglaodiaptomus lintoni (S. A. Forbes, 1893)
Aglaodiaptomus marshianus M. S. Wilson, 1953 
Aglaodiaptomus pseudosanguineus (Turner, 1921)
Aglaodiaptomus saskatchewanensis M. S. Wilson, 1958
Aglaodiaptomus savagei DeBiase & Taylor, 2000
Aglaodiaptomus spatulocrenatus (Pearse, 1906)
Aglaodiaptomus stagnalis (S. A. Forbes, 1882)

References

Diaptomidae
Taxonomy articles created by Polbot